Marshall Tuck (born July 28, 1973) is an American educator, venture capital investor, and politician. He has served as CEO of Antonio Villaraigosa's Partnership for Los Angeles Schools, and as President of Green Dot Public Schools. Tuck was a candidate for California State Superintendent of Public Instruction in 2014 and 2018, losing in the general election in both races. He is currently a finalist for the position of Superintendent of the Orleans Parish School Board in New Orleans, Louisiana.

Early life and education 
Tuck was born in Burlingame, California, and grew up in Hillsborough. He attended parochial elementary school and public middle and high schools, graduating from San Mateo High School. His father was a lawyer and his mother was a teacher. Tuck is one of four children.

Tuck graduated from UCLA and Harvard Business School. After school, he worked for two years at Wall Street Bank Salomon Brothers before spending a year teaching and doing service work internationally. He then became a senior leader at Model N, a revenue management software company based in the Silicon Valley, before switching careers to work full-time in education.

Education career 
In 2007, after serving as an education advisor to Los Angeles Mayor Antonio Villaraigosa, he became the founding CEO of the Partnership for Los Angeles Schools, a collaboration between the City of Los Angeles and the Los Angeles Unified School District, which began by operating 10 public schools.

The contract between Mayor Antonio Villaraigosa’s office and the Los Angeles Unified School District eventually included 17 struggling elementary, middle, and high schools serving about 15,000 students. Tuck claims these schools raised four-year graduation rates by more than 60%, had the highest academic improvement among California’s school systems with more than 10,000 students. and boasted the Parent College, a parent engagement program. A recent report by a third-party research institute included the Partnership as a new governance model for public education that is being used as an alternative to charter schools in communities that are resistant to new charter schools. News coverage of the Partnership's 10-year history noted it as a "unique turnaround model is driving big gains at struggling campuses. Tuck continues to serve as a member of the Partnership for Los Angeles Schools' Board of Directors.

The Partnership for Los Angeles Schools faced controversy during Tuck's tenure. Teachers at 8 of 10 schools gave Tuck landslide votes of "no confidence" after his first year. Parents at Ritter Elementary School, together with the Mexican American Legal Defense and Educational Fund, filed a complaint in 2009 after Tuck cut dual language immersion programs. After three years of Tuck's leadership, the Los Angeles Times reported that while academic performance had improved at the Partnership for Los Angeles Schools, improvements were greater at Los Angeles Unified schools with similar demographics.

Prior to that Tuck had served as President of the Charter Management Organization (CMO) Green Dot Public Schools, where he helped to create 10 new public charter high schools in some of Los Angeles' poorest neighborhoods. Of the 10 schools that Tuck helped to open, 8 have been recognized by the U.S. News & World Report as among the best high schools in the country.

Tuck is also currently a board member of the nonprofit Parent Revolution, an organization with the mission to "ensure families, especially those from historically underserved communities, can use their power to secure an excellent public education for their children, children in their community, and all children in California."

Most recently Tuck was an Educator-in-Residence at the New Teacher Center, a nonprofit organization working with school districts to help develop and retain effective teachers and principals.

2014 election for State Superintendent 
In 2014, Tuck ran a campaign against the incumbent State Superintendent of Public Instruction in California. During the campaign, Tuck won the endorsement of every major newspaper in the state, including the Los Angeles Times, the San Francisco Chronicle, the San Diego Union-Tribune, the Sacramento Bee, the Fresno Bee, the San Jose Mercury News, and the East Bay Times, among others.

The race received national attention, and money raised and spent on the campaigns exceeded that spent in that year's gubernatorial election between Governor Jerry Brown, and challenger Neel Kashkari. A recurring issue in the campaign was an ongoing legal challenge at the time to the state's laws which grant teacher permanent status ("tenure") after two years. Tuck said he supported the students who brought the lawsuit, and wanted to see California law change to extend the amount of time before a teacher had to earn tenure or be let go.

Tuck was among the top two vote-getters in the primary. In the general election, he lost to incumbent Tom Torlakson, receiving about 48% of the vote (2.9 million votes).

2018 election for State Superintendent 
In March 2017, Tuck announced that he would run again for State Superintendent of Public Instruction in 2018. While the role of State Superintendent in California is nonpartisan, Tuck is a Democrat. At the California State Democratic Party convention in February 2018, he was “roundly booed” during his speech. He received 5% of the votes of delegates while his opponent, Tony Thurmond, received 89%, and 6% voted for No Endorsement.

Tuck was endorsed by the California Charter Schools Association, San Francisco Chronicle, the San Jose Mercury News and East Bay Times, the San Diego Union-Tribune, the Association of California School Administrators, President Obama's Education Secretary Arne Duncan, the California Peace Officers' Association, former Bay Area Congressman George Miller, San Diego Assemblymember Dr. Shirley Weber, San Francisco State Senator Scott Wiener, Los Angeles Assemblymember Blanca Rubio, among others.

Tuck pledged not to accept any contributions from PACs or corporations, and raised nearly $4 million from over 3,000 individual donors. However, he received over $160,000 in contributions bundled by the Govern for California PAC. His major donors included billionaires associated with the charter school industry, including Bill Bloomfield, Eli Broad, Arthur Rock, and members of the Walton family and heirs to the Walmart fortune Carrie Walton Penner, Alice Walton, and Jim Walton. It was discovered in January 2018 that Tuck had accepted donations from an anti-gay activist. The campaign returned the money under pressure from Equality California, the largest state LGBTQ organization in the United States.

During the campaign, Tuck came under criticism from educators for his support from billionaires associated with Education Secretary Betsy DeVos and Bill Evers, a fellow at the conservative Hoover Institution and education advisor to President Donald Trump. In May 2018, the California Democratic Party issued an official statement in response to Tuck's refusal to disavow his appearance on Republican slate mailers saying, "The fact that Tuck is okay with cozying up to some of the most despicable Republicans in the country speaks volumes about what his true priorities are.”

Tuck finished in first place in the June 2018 primary, and advanced to the November general election. He received 2,223,784 votes in the primary.

The general election campaign for State Superintendent received national attention. Washington Post columnist George Will expressed his support for Tuck's candidacy in "A California election that might actually matter" and President Obama's Education Secretary Arne Duncan penned an OpEd for the San Jose Mercury News, also supporting Tuck and urging voters to "forget the lies in the state schools' superintendent race.". Tuck narrowly lost the election to his opponent, Tony Thurmond.

Personal life 
Tuck has spent most of his adult life in Los Angeles. He currently lives in Los Angeles with his wife, Mae, and their son, Mason. Mae is a first generation Chinese-American. Mason attends their local public school in the Los Angeles Unified School District.

References

1973 births
Harvard Business School alumni
Living people
People from Burlingame, California
University of California, Los Angeles alumni